The Berre is a coastal river flowing through the Aude department in the Occitanie region of France. It discharges into the Mediterranean Sea at Port-la-Nouvelle.

See also
Berre (Rhône), a river in France, affluent of the Rhône

References

Rivers of Aude
Rivers of France
Rivers of Occitania (administrative region)